Haldor is a given name. It may refer to:

Haldor Andreas Haldorsen (1883–1965), Norwegian politician for the Liberal Party
Haldor Børve (1857–1933), Norwegian architect
Haldor Bjerkeseth (1883–1974), Norwegian politician for the Christian Democratic Party
Haldor Boen (1851–1912), American congressman from Minnesota
Haldor Halderson (1900–1965), Canadian ice hockey player who competed in the 1920 Summer Olympics
Haldor Johan Hanson (1856–1929), American hymn writer, publisher and author
Haldor Lægreid, Norwegian musical artist
Haldor Lillenas (1885–1959), minister in the Church of the Nazarene, author, song evangelist, poet, music publisher and prolific hymnwriter

See also
 Haldor Topsoe, Danish catalyst company
 Halldor

Norwegian masculine given names

de:Haldor
no:Haldor